Tsedenbal is a Mongolian personal name.

Notable people bearing this name include:

Proper name 
 Yumjaagiin Tsedenbal (1916–1991), one of the leaders of Mongolia from 1952 to 1984
 Norjmoogiin Tsedenbal (born 1988), Mongolian international footballer

Patronymic 
 Tsedenbalyn Tümenjargal (born 1989), Mongolian international footballer